Antonino Daì (born 8 February 1984) is an Italian football player.

Club career
He made his professional debut in the Lega Pro for Trapani on 4 September 2011 in a game against Prato.

References

External links
 

1984 births
Sportspeople from the Province of Trapani
Footballers from Sicily
Living people
Italian footballers
A.C. Carpi players
Trapani Calcio players
Serie B players
Serie C players
Serie D players
Association football defenders